Joel Isaac Solanilla Valdespino (born 24 December 1983 in Panama, Panama) is a Panamanian football defender who most recently played for Panamanian second division team Costa del Este.

Playing career

Club
Solanilla started his career with Argentinian side Talleres de Córdoba, but has spent most of his playing career in Panama, joining Plaza Amador in January 2004. He made a move to Colombian first division side Envigado in 2006, only to leave them in August 2006 claiming the club owed him salary.

In August 2007, Solanilla moved abroad again to play for Salvadoran side FAS from San Francisco, whom he had only joined a month earlier.

He joined Guatemalan club Deportivo Malacateco in December 2011 on loan from Sporting San Miguelito, only to be released by the club in March 2012 after playing only 5 matches.

He went on to play in the Panamanian second division and joined Costa del Este ahead of the 2014 Clausura.

International
Solanilla played at the 2003 FIFA World Youth Championship in the United Arab Emirates.

He made his senior debut for Panama in a February 2003 UNCAF Nations Cup match against Guatemala and has earned a total of 30 caps, scoring no goals. He represented his country in 5 FIFA World Cup qualification matches and was a member of the 2005 CONCACAF Gold Cup team, who finished second in the tournament and he also played at the 2009 CONCACAF Gold Cup.

His final international was a July 2009 CONCACAF Gold Cup match against Nicaragua.

Personal life
His parents are Isaac Solanilla and Yadira Valdespino. His older brother Osvaldo won 10 caps for Panama in 1996 and 1997.

References

External links

 Profile - CD FAS

1983 births
Living people
Sportspeople from Panama City
Association football central defenders
Panamanian footballers
Categoría Primera A players
Talleres de Córdoba footballers
C.D. Plaza Amador players
Patriotas Boyacá footballers
C.D. Árabe Unido players
Envigado F.C. players
San Francisco F.C. players
C.D. FAS footballers
Sporting San Miguelito players
C.D. Malacateco players
Panama international footballers
2003 UNCAF Nations Cup players
2005 UNCAF Nations Cup players
2005 CONCACAF Gold Cup players
2007 UNCAF Nations Cup players
2009 UNCAF Nations Cup players
2009 CONCACAF Gold Cup players
Copa Centroamericana-winning players
Panamanian expatriate footballers
Expatriate footballers in Argentina
Expatriate footballers in Colombia
Expatriate footballers in El Salvador
Expatriate footballers in Guatemala